Parliamentary elections were held in Tajikistan on 27 February and 13 March, 2005. The People's Democratic Party of Tajikistan, headed by President Emomali Rahmonov, won a 41-seat majority in the 63-seat Assembly of Representatives.

Independent election observers from the Organization for Security and Co-operation in Europe (OSCE) monitored the election at the request of the Tajik government. According to the mission's final report: "The 2005 parliamentary elections in Tajikistan failed to meet many of the key OSCE commitments for democratic elections contained in the 1990 Copenhagen Document, and they were also not conducted fully in accordance with domestic law. Although some efforts were made to improve the legislative and administrative framework for democratic elections, a commensurate effort to ensure effective implementation was largely lacking. Therefore, despite some improvement over previous elections, large-scale irregularities were evident, particularly on [e]lection day."

Results

References 

Elections in Tajikistan
2005 elections in Asia
2005 in Tajikistan